Bayberry wax is an aromatic green vegetable wax. It is removed from the surface of the fruit of the bayberry (wax-myrtle) shrub (ex. Myrica cerifera) by boiling the fruits in water and skimming the wax from the surface of the water. It is made up primarily of esters of lauric, myristic, and palmitic acid.

Uses
Bayberry wax is used primarily in the manufacture of scented candles and other products where its distinctive resinous fragrance is desirable.

Properties
Melting point = 
Acid value = 3.5
Saponification value = 205–217
Iodine number = 1.9–3.9

References

Waxes